Węglowice  is a village in the administrative district of Gmina Wręczyca Wielka, within Kłobuck County, Silesian Voivodeship, in southern Poland.

The village has a population of 367. It was established by German settlers at the turn of the 19th century together with Puszczew.

The Village is also home for Weglowice summer school, a language camp that runs throughout the summer of each year.  The town is famed for its lodzerina and public house, that are renowned across Europe.

References

Villages in Kłobuck County